Alessandro Tadini (born 30 November 1973) is an Italian professional golfer.

Career
Tadini was born in Borgomanero and turned professional in 1994. He qualified for the European Tour for 2003 after his sixth visit to qualifying school. He was unable to win enough money during his rookie season to retain his card and dropped down to the second tier Challenge Tour. In 2004 he finished second on the Challenge Tour Rankings to graduate back to the top level. He retained his card through the end of the 2007 season when he again fell back to the Challenge Tour. He bounced straight back, finishing in 7th place on the 2008 Challenge Tour Rankings, but was just outside the top 120 in the Race to Dubai in 2009 and was back on the Challenge Tour in 2010.

Tadini has won four time on the Challenge Tour, the first in 2004 at the Costa Rica Open, the second in 2008 at the Oceânico Group Pro-Am Challenge, the third in 2010 at the Credit Suisse Challenge, and the latest at the ECCO Tour Championship in 2012.

Tadini's best season to date on the European Tour was 2005, when he finished 98th, whilst his best result has been a runner-up finish in the dual-ranking 2004 Aa St Omer Open.

Amateur wins
1994 Italian Amateur Stroke Play Championship

Professional wins (9)

Challenge Tour wins (4)

1Co-sanctioned by the Tour de las Américas
2Co-sanctioned by the Danish Golf Tour

Challenge Tour playoff record (2–0)

Italian Pro Tour wins (1)

Other wins (4)
2002 Italian PGA Championship
2008 Italian PGA Championship
2009 Italian National Open
2012 Italian National Open

Team appearances
Professional
World Cup (representing Italy): 2004
European Championships (representing Italy): 2018

See also
2008 Challenge Tour graduates
2011 Challenge Tour graduates
2012 Challenge Tour graduates
2014 European Tour Qualifying School graduates
List of golfers with most Challenge Tour wins

References

External links

Italian male golfers
European Tour golfers
Asian Tour golfers
Monegasque sportsmen
People from Borgomanero
Sportspeople from the Province of Novara
1973 births
Living people